The Vuelta a la Comunitat Valenciana Feminas is a women's one-day road cycling race held in Spain. It is currently rated as a 1.1 event.

Winners

References

Cycle races in Spain
2019 establishments in Spain
Recurring sporting events established in 2019